Sarah Ann Island (also spelled Sarah Anne) was long thought to be a vanished island, located at  (though sometimes listed at about 175° W). It was supposedly discovered in 1858 and claimed by an American guano firm, under the Guano Islands Act (as Sarah Anne). This Sarah Ann Island, however, has probably never been anything else than modern Malden Island.

A search in 1932 by German astronomers was unsuccessful.
In 1937, the United States Pacific Fleet attempted to locate the island, intending to establish an observatory there to view the solar eclipse of June 8, 1937, but was also unsuccessful. The island, which had been observed 15 years before, was nowhere to be found. Instead, observations were made on the nearby Canton and Enderbury Islands and Sarah Ann was quietly removed from Naval charts and has become a phantom island.

One explanation is that Sarah Ann Island was identical to Malden Island, but due to a clerical error it was listed at 4° N instead of 4° S.

References

Former islands of the United States
Uninhabited Pacific islands of the United States
Pacific islands claimed under the Guano Islands Act
Phantom islands
1858 in the United States
1858 establishments